A total of 75 teams entered the 1970 FIFA World Cup qualification rounds, competing for a total of 16 spots in the final tournament. Hosts Mexico and defending champions England qualified automatically, leaving 14 spots open for competition.

For the first time, the winners of both the African zone and the Asian and Oceanian zone were guaranteed a direct place in the final tournament. The 16 spots available in the 1970 World Cup would be distributed among the continental zones as follows:
 Europe (UEFA): 9 places, 1 of them went to automatic qualifier England, while the other 8 places were contested by 29 teams.
 South America (CONMEBOL): 3 places, contested by 10 teams.
 North, Central America and Caribbean (CONCACAF): 2 places, 1 of them went to automatic qualifier Mexico, while the other 1 place was contested by 13 teams.
 Africa (CAF): 1 place, contested by 13 teams. (13 teams applied, but FIFA rejected the entries of Guinea and Zaire, leaving 11 teams. A 14th team from Africa, Rhodesia, entered through a non-CAF qualifying system.)
 Asia and Oceania (AFC/OFC): 1 place, contested by 7 teams (including Rhodesia).

A total of 68 teams played in at least one qualifying match. A total of 172 qualifying matches were played, and 542 goals were scored (an average of 3.15 per match).

Listed below are the dates and results of the qualification rounds.

Key:
Teams highlighted in green qualified for the finals.
Teams highlighted in red in the same table finished level on points and advanced to a play-off on neutral ground.

Qualified teams

Confederation qualification

AFC and OFC

North Korea withdrew because they refused to play with Israel. There would be three rounds of play:
First Round: Israel, New Zealand and Rhodesia received byes and advanced to the Second Round directly. The remaining 3 teams, Australia, Japan and South Korea, played against each other twice in South Korea. The group winner would advance to the Second Round.
Second Round: The 4 teams were divided into 2 groups of 2 teams each. The teams played against each other twice. The group winners would advance to the Final Round.
Final Round: The 2 teams played against each other on a home-and-away basis. The winner would qualify.

First round

Second round

Final round

CAF

FIFA rejected the entries of Guinea and Zaire. There would be three rounds of play:
First Round: Ghana received a bye and advanced to the Second Round directly. The remaining 10 teams were paired up to play knockout matches on a home-and-away basis. The winners (determined by aggregate score) would advance to the Second Round.
Second Round: The 6 teams were paired up to play knockout matches on a home-and-away basis. The winners would advance to the Final Round.
Final Round: The 3 teams played against each other on a home-and-away basis. The group winner would qualify.

First round

|}

Second round

|}

Final round

Morocco qualified.

CONCACAF

FIFA rejected the entry of Cuba. There would be three rounds of play:
First Round: The remaining 12 teams were divided into 4 groups of 3 teams each. The teams played against each other on a home-and-away basis. The group winners would advance to the Semifinal Round.
Semifinal Round: The 4 teams were paired up to play knockout matches on a home-and-away basis. The winners would advance to the Final Round.
Final Round: The 2 teams played against each other on a home-and-away basis. The winner would qualify.

First round

Group 1

Group 2

Group 3

Group 4

Second round

Group 1

Group 2

Play-off

Third round

Play-off

CONMEBOL

The 10 teams were divided into 3 groups; two groups with 3 teams and one group with 4 teams. The teams played against each other on a home-and-away basis. The group winners would qualify.

Group 1

Group 2

Group 3

UEFA

(30 teams competing for 8 berths)

FIFA rejected the entry of Albania. The remaining 29 teams were divided into 8 groups, 3 groups with 3 teams and 5 groups with 4 teams. The teams played against each other on a home-and-away basis. The group winners would qualify.

Goalscorers
10 goals

 Tostão

9 goals

 Gerd Müller

7 goals

 Juan Ramón Martínez
 Gigi Riva
 Włodzimierz Lubański

6 goals

 Johan Devrindt
 Pelé
 Ferenc Bene
 Kazimierz Deyna
 Colin Stein
 Ove Kindvall

5 goals

 Erich Hof
 Odilon Polleunis
 Jozef Adamec

4 goals

 Tom McColl
 Helmut Redl
 Georgi Asparuhov
 Hristo Bonev
 Guy Saint-Vil
 Garba Okoye
 Andrzej Jarosik
 Warren Archibald
 Dragan Džajić

3 goals

 Jairzinho
 Karol Jokl
 Ole Sørensen
 Arto Tolsa
 Hervé Revelli
 Vasilis Botinos
 Giorgos Sideris
 Guy François
 Joseph Obas
 Antal Dunai
 Mordechai Spiegler
 Houmane Jarir
 Ola Dybwad-Olsen
 Eusébio
 Florea Dumitrache
 Alan Gilzean
 José Eulogio Gárate
 Peter Millar
 Willy Roy
 Wolfgang Overath
 Vahidin Musemić
 Slaven Zambata
 Emment Kapengwe

2 goals

 Rafael Albrecht
 Ray Baartz
 Johnny Watkiss
 Wilfried Puis
 Raúl Alvarez
 Eduardo Antunes Coimbra
 Dinko Dermendzhiev
 Ralph McPate
 Nick Papadakis
 Tibor Vigh
 Adolfo Olivares
 Francisco Valdéz
 Jaime González
 Hermenegildo Segrera
 Eduardo Chavarria
 Vladimír Hagara
 Ladislav Kuna
 Andrej Kvašňák
 Wolfram Löwe
 Eberhard Vogel
 Elmer Acevedo
 Victor Manuel Azucar
 Juan Francisco Barraza
 Joel Estrada
 José Quintanilla
 Zerga Geremew
 Asmeron Germa
 Tommy Lindholm
 Jean-Claude Bras
 Giorgos Dedes
 Hugues Guillaume
 Rigoberto Gómez
 Donaldo Rosales
 Lajos Kocsis
 Don Givens
 Yehoshua Feigenbaum
 Giora Spiegel
 Sandro Mazzola
 Teruki Miyamoto
 Johny Léonard
 Mohammed El Filali
 Theo Pahlplatz
 Mohammed Lawal
 Olumuyiwa Oshode
 Terry Harkin
 Saturnino Arrúa
 Oswaldo Ramírez
 Jacinto Santos
 Bobby Chalmers
 Bobby Murdoch
 Jeong Gang-Ji
 Park Soo-Il
 Kakhi Asatiani
 Volodymyr Muntyan
 Givi Nodia
 Amancio Amaro
 Nasr El-Din Abbas
 Aboubakar Bakheit
 Ali Gagarin
 Abubakr Osman
 Paul Ruben Corte
 Jules Lagadeau
 Ruud Schoonhoven
 Roy Vanenburg
 Bo Larsson
 Fritz Künzli
 Georges Vuilleumier
 Ezzedine Chakroun
 Gerry Baker
 Helmut Haller
 Josip Bukal
 Metodije Spasovski

1 goal

 Boualem Amirouche
 Alberto Rendo
 Aníbal Tarabini
 Willie Rutherford
 Johnny Warren
 Wilhelm Kreuz
 Helmut Siber
 August Starek
 Léon Semmeling
 Clyde Best
 Winston Trott
 Ramiro Blacut
 Juan Américo Díaz
 Rivelino
 Dimitar Penev
 Dimitar Yakimov
 David Ayo
 Dieudonné Bassanguen
 Norbert Owona
 Norman Patterson
 Sergio Zanatta
 Jorge Ramírez Gallego
 Orlando Mesa
 Javier Tamayo
 Leonel Hernández
 Edgar Núñez
 Roy Sáenz
 Walford Vaughns
 Mario Vega
 Panicos Efthimiadis
 Nicos Kantzilieris
 Dušan Kabát
 František Veselý
 Bent Jensen
 Ulrik Le Fevre
 Ole Madsen
 Henning Frenzel
 Hans-Jürgen Kreische
 Peter Rock
 Félix Lasso
 Tom Rodríguez
 Mauricio Ernesto González
 Mauricio Alonso Rodríguez
 Kebede Asfaw
 Emmanuel Feseha
 Mengistu Worku
 Turo Flink
 Jean Djorkaeff
 Abekah Ankrah
 Emmanuel Ola
 Mimis Domazos
 Kostas Elefterakis
 Giorgos Koudas
 Mimis Papaioannou
 Édgar González
 Nelson Melgar
 David Stokes
 Claude Barthélemy
 Jean-Claude Désir
 Reynold Saint Surin
 Philippe Vorbe
 José Cardona
 Rafael Dick
 Reynaldo Mejia
 Marco Antonio Mendoza
 José Urquia
 Leonard Wells
 Flórián Albert
 János Farkas
 László Fazekas
 Zoltán Halmosi
 Lajos Puskás
 Lajos Szűcs
 Eamonn Rogers
 Angelo Domenghini
 Lascelles Dunkley
 Evan Welsh
 Yasuyuki Kuwahara
 Masashi Watanabe
 Mahmoud Al-Jahani
 Ahmed Ben Soed
 Mohamed Koussa
 Josy Kirchens
 Paul Philipp
 Hassan Akesbi
 Driss Bamous
 Boujemaa Benkhrif
 Ahmed Faras
 Cherkaoui Hafnaoui
 Moulay Khanousi
 Johan Cruyff
 Dick van Dijk
 Willem van Hanegem
 Wim Jansen
 Sjaak Roggeveen
 Wietse Veenstra
 Henk Wery
 Wouter Brokke
 Antonio Martina
 Elcio Martina
 Joseph Aghoghovbia
 Peter Anieke
 Sam Garba
 Sebastian Broderick Imasuen
 Sunday Ineh
 Augustine Ofuokwu
 Samuel Opone
 George Best
 William Campbell
 Derek Dougan
 Eric McMordie
 Jimmy Nicholson
 Odd Iversen
 Lorenzo Gimenez
 Aurelio Martínez
 Pablo Rojas
 Alcides Sosa
 Roberto Challe
 Luis Cruzado
 Teófilo Cubillas
 Alberto Gallardo
 Pedro Pablo León
 Bronisław Bula
 Jerzy Wilim
 José Augusto de Almeida
 Jacinto João
 Fernando Peres
 Emerich Dembrovschi
 Nicolae Dobrin
 Flavius Domide
 Billy Bremner
 Tommy Gemmell
 Eddie Gray
 Willie Henderson
 Jimmy Johnstone
 Denis Law
 Billy McNeill
 Emile Pierre Diéme
 Abdoulaye Makhtar Diop
 Kim Ki-Bok
 Lee Yi-Woo
 Anatoliy Byshovets
 Vitaliy Khmelnytskyi
 Juan Manuel Asensi
 Miguel Ángel Bustillo
 Pirri
 Joaquín Sierra
 Manuel Velázquez
 Gadalla Kheir El-Sayed Ali
 Osman El-Fadil
 Omar Ali Hasab El-Rasoul
 Abdel Kafi El-Sheikh
 Abdel-Wahab Abdel-Fadil Jadallah
 Awad Nasr Musa
 Ahmed Bushara Wahba
 Stuart Oosthuizen
 Edwin Schal
 Leif Eriksson
 Ove Grahn
 Roland Grip
 Örjan Persson
 René-Pierre Quentin
 Tahar Chaïbi
 Abdesselem Cheman
 Ender Konca
 Ogün Altıparmak
 Dietrich Albrecht
 Siegfried Stritzl
 Atilio Ancheta
 Rúben Bareño
 Julio César Cortés
 Pedro Rocha
 Oscar Zubía
 Luis Mendoza Benedetto
 Mike England
 David Powell
 John Toshack
 Klaus Fichtel
 Sigfried Held
 Horst-Dieter Höttges
 Reinhard Libuda
 Max Lorenz
 Rudolf Belin
 Ivica Osim
 Miroslav Pavlović
 Denijal Pirić
 Edin Sprečo
 Godfrey Chitalu
 Sandy Kaposa
 Dickson Makwaza

1 own goal

 David Zeman (playing against Israel)
 Johann Eigenstiller (playing against West Germany)
 Rudolph Smith (playing against the United States)
 Ramiro Tobar (playing against Chile)
 Aritatsu Ogi (playing against Australia)
 Valentín Mendoza (playing against Brazil)
 Héctor Chumpitaz (playing against Bolivia)
 José Torres (playing against Greece)
 Phillemon Tegire (playing against Australia)
 Bruno Michaud (playing against Romania)
 Tyrone de la Bastide (playing against Guatemala)
 Selwyn Murren (playing against Guatemala)

Notes

In the African zone, aggregate score was used to determine the winners of two-legged ties. However, different tie-breakers were used in the matches when the aggregate score was tied.
Morocco was the first African team to qualify since Egypt in the 1934 World Cup.
As a result of the hostile relationship between El Salvador and Honduras, and rioting during the qualification matches between them, the short-lived Football War broke out between the two countries.
Israel qualified for their only World Cup to date as an Asian team. However, soon after this, they were expelled from the Asian Football Confederation, and now compete in the European zone as they are now a member of UEFA.

References

External links
FIFA World Cup Official Site – 1970 World Cup Qualification 
RSSSF – 1970 World Cup Qualification

 
World Cup
World Cup
FIFA World Cup qualification